This includes is a list of NBA on ABC commentators, sideline reporters, and analysts, through the years. The list covers current and former personnel, and their job function. In addition to the English-language broadcasts, ABC also has Spanish-language broadcasts on SAP using ESPN Deportes audio that began in 2015.

Current

In-game

Play-by-play
Mike Breen (2006–present)
Mark Jones (2016–present)
Dave Pasch (2015–present)

Analysts
Hubie Brown (2004–present)
Mark Jackson (2007–2011; 2014–present)
Jeff Van Gundy (2007–present)
Doris Burke (2017-present)
Richard Jefferson 
Vince Carter 
JJ Redick

Reporters
Doris Burke (2008–2019)
Israel Gutierrez (2015–present)
Lisa Salters (2004–present)
Cassidy Hubbarth (2016-present)

Rules Analyst
Steve Javie (2012–present)

Studio

Hosts
Mike Greenberg (2021–present)

Analysts
Magic Johnson (2008–2013; 2016–2017; 2021–present)
Jalen Rose (2012–present)
Stephen A. Smith (2020–present)
Michael Wilbon (2005–2013; 2016–2017; 2021–present)
Adrian Wojnarowski (2019–present)

Former

Play-by-play
Jim Durham (2005–2006)
Al Michaels (2003–2005)
Brent Musburger (2002–2006)
Brad Nessler (2002–2004)
John Saunders (2005–2006)
Mike Tirico (2006–2016)

Analysts
Sean Elliott (2002–2004)
Len Elmore (alternate game analyst, 2004–2006)
Steve Jones (2005–2006)
Tim Legler (2006)
Dan Majerle (2003–2004)
Jack Ramsay (2005)
Doc Rivers (2003–2004)
Tom Tolbert (2002–2003)
Bill Walton (2002–2003, 2005–2006)

Reporters
David Aldridge (2002–2003)
Heather Cox (2008–2016)
Mark Jones (2005–2007)
Sal Masekela (2002–2003)
Rachel Nichols (2020–2021)
Tom Rinaldi (2017–2020)
Michele Tafoya (2002–2008)

Studio hosts
Dan Patrick (2006–2007)
John Saunders (substitute studio host from 2003–2005)
Stuart Scott (2007–2011)
Sage Steele (2013–2016)
Hannah Storm (2011)
Mike Tirico (studio host, 2002–2006)
Michelle Beadle (2016–2019)
Maria Taylor (2019–2021)
Rachel Nichols (2018–2021)

Studio analysts
Avery Johnson (2008–2010)
Doug Collins (2013–2016)
Richard Jefferson (2019–2021)
Steve Jones (2004–2005)
George Karl (2003–2004)
Paul Pierce (2017–2021)
Scottie Pippen (2005–2006)
Byron Scott (2004)
Bill Simmons (2012–2014)
Tom Tolbert (2002–2004)
Bill Walton (2002–2003, 2004–2005, 2007–2008)
Jay Williams (2019–2021)

1962–1973 version
Marv Albert (game analyst)
Howard Cosell (game analyst; sideline reporter)
Bob Cousy (game analyst)
Dave Diles (sideline reporter)
Bill Flemming (play-by-play)
Chet Forte (play-by-play)
Jim Gordon (play-by-play)
Curt Gowdy (play-by-play)
Jerry Gross (play-by-play)
Chuck Howard (game analyst)
Keith Jackson (play-by-play)
Johnny Kerr (game analyst)
Jim McKay (play-by-play)
Bill Russell (game analyst)
Chris Schenkel (play-by-play)
Jack Twyman (game analyst)
Jerry West (game analyst)

Playoffs

Spanish
Since 2015, games are available in Spanish on SAP using ESPN Deportes audio.
Until 2014, the games had a Spanish version on SAP with different commentators from the ESPN Deportes telecast.
Álvaro Martín
Carlos Morales
Jerry Olaya
Roberto Abramowitz
Fernando Álvarez
Pablo Viruega
Manu Martín
Sebastián Martínez Christensen
Leopoldo González
Robert Sierra

References

ABC broadcasters
ABC broadcasters
NBA on ABC broadcasters